Pygery is a town in South Australia on the Eyre Peninsula and on the Eyre Highway,  north-west of the state capital, Adelaide. The town is part of the Wudinna District Council local government area. The town name is derived from the Aboriginal word paitjariti meaning "fighting place".

References

Towns in South Australia
Eyre Peninsula